The Battle of Ridgeway (sometimes the Battle of Lime Ridge or Limestone Ridge) was fought in the vicinity of the town of Fort Erie across the Niagara River from Buffalo, New York, near the village of Ridgeway, Canada West, currently Ontario, Canada, on June 2, 1866, between Canadian troops and an irregular army of Irish-American invaders, the Fenians. It was the largest engagement of the Fenian Raids, the first modern industrial-era battle to be fought by Canadians and the first to be fought only by Canadian troops and led exclusively by Canadian officers. The battlefield was designated a National Historic Site of Canada in 1921 and is the last battle fought within the current boundaries of Ontario against a foreign invasion. The action at Ridgeway has the distinction of being the only armed victory for the cause of Irish independence between the Irish Rebellion of 1798 and the Easter Rising in 1916.

Background
The New York City-based Fenian Brotherhood was attempting to support related groups in Ireland to force the United Kingdom into negotiating toward the formation of an independent Irish Republic. They took advantage of the ready supply of arms in the United States after the recently concluded Civil War, and of the ample number of unemployed young men who had emerged from that conflict with some degree of military training. The plan was to take Canada temporarily hostage in the hope of demoralizing British rule in Ireland by precipitating a political crisis in Britain. The Fenians were also mistakenly counting on receiving U.S. recognition for the seizure of Canadian territory.  It was still a ragtag army, however, that assembled on the American shore of the Niagara River during the last weeks of May 1866.  The Fenians had made little attempt at secrecy, and both American and British authorities were aware of the imminent military operation but could not pin-point the exact crossing points in advance.

Units involved
The Fenian units involved in the battle were the 7th Buffalo (NY), the 18th Ohio, the 13th Tennessee, and the 17th Kentucky Fenian Regiments, as well as independent companies from Indiana and from New Orleans (the Fenian Louisiana Tigers). The Fenians wore an assortment of blue U.S. Army and grey Confederate Army tunics, some with green facings sewn to them, but many of the Fenians took to the field in civilian clothing with green scarves.  The Fenians carried battle standards consisting of the Irish 'sunburst' in gold on a green background and one standard featuring the Irish Harp.

The Canadian units at Ridgeway comprised the Queen's Own Rifles of Toronto (which had 7 killed, 2 died of wounds and 21 wounded in the battle); the 13th Hamilton Battalion, predecessor of the modern Royal Hamilton Light Infantry Regiment (which had 15 wounded) and the Caledonia and York rifle companies, predecessors of The Haldimand Rifles (of which the latter had 2 men wounded). Canadian Orangeman Alexander Muir, author of the unofficial Canadian national anthem, "The Maple Leaf Forever", fought with the Queen's Own at Ridgeway.

Invasion

First day of Fenian crossings
The Fenian insurgents, led by Brigadier General John O'Neill, a former Union cavalry commander who had specialized in anti-guerrilla warfare in Ohio, secured boats and transferred some 800 men across the Niagara, landing above Fort Erie, before dawn on June 1, 1866.

An additional 200–400 Fenians and supplies crossed later during the morning and early afternoon until the US Navy gunboat, the USS Michigan, began intercepting Fenian barges at 2:20 p.m. — 13 hours after the first Fenian advance party landed in Canada.

An advance party of 250 men of Lieutenant Colonel George Owen Starr's 17th Kentucky Fenian Regiment landed in Canada at about 1:30 AM and raised a large Fenian green flag with a gold Irish harp some two hours in advance of O'Neill's main force. Starr's advance party rushed to seize the town, cut telegraph wires and take control of the railway yards south of Fort Erie by dawn as the rest of O'Neill's force was disembarking. U.S. authorities also allowed unarmed men to board the ferry from Buffalo and small boats freely crossed the Niagara River until the afternoon. It is estimated that at least 1,000 and possibly as many as 1,350 Fenians in total crossed during the first thirteen hours of June 1, but it is impossible to determine a precise number.

O'Neill spent the first day trying to rally the local citizenry to the Fenian cause and to commandeer supplies for his mission, but his force was plagued by desertions almost from the outset. By nightfall, O'Neill estimated that he had perhaps 500 men remaining in his camp. Later during the night, O'Neill was reinforced by an additional column of 200 Fenians who had been deployed earlier on a bridgehead at Black Creek guarding against an approach from Chippawa in the north, bringing his total strength at Ridgeway to at least 650 men.

Battle

Meanwhile, the British were mobilizing both local Canadian militia and British garrison troops to defend against the impending invasion of Canada.  The Fenians night-marched north across Black Creek (Ontario) through a cedar swamp, then turned inland on Ridge Road on the morning of June 2; taking up a defensive position on Limestone Ridge near the present Canadian town of Ridgeway. There, they clashed with 850 advancing Canadian militia (the dark-green uniformed Queen's Own Rifles of Toronto and the traditionally clad red-coated 13th Battalion of Hamilton, reinforced by two local companies from Caledonia and York) commanded by Lieutenant Colonel Alfred Booker of the 13th Battalion.
In the first hour of the battle, the Canadians appeared to prevail, driving Fenian skirmishers back across Bertie Road. Then something went wrong: to this day, it is not clear exactly what. Some sources say that the Canadian militiamen mistook Fenian scouts on horseback for cavalry. Orders to form a square to defend against a cavalry charge, although quickly countermanded, led to chaos in the Canadian ranks and Booker ordered a withdrawal after ninety minutes of battle. Other sources indicate that troops mistook a company of redcoated 13th Battalion infantry for British troops relieving them and began to withdraw; which then triggered a panic among other troops who mistook the withdrawal for a retreat. O'Neill, observing the chaos breaking out in the Canadian ranks, quickly ordered a bayonet charge that completely routed the inexperienced Canadians. The Fenians took and briefly held the town of Ridgeway. Then, expecting to be overwhelmed by British reinforcements, they quickly turned back to Fort Erie where they fought a second battle, the Battle of Fort Erie (1866), against a small but determined detachment of Canadians holding the town.

The Canadian loss was 9 killed, 37 wounded (some severely enough to require amputation), and 22 died of wounds or disease later. One British soldier, Corporal Carrington, 47th Regiment of Foot Lancashire died on a forced march from Chippawa to Stevensville. His grave was identified 146 years later on the eve of Remembrance Day 2012. O'Neill claimed he had one or two men killed, but Canadians claimed more. The relatively low casualty figures make this an interesting battle for proponents of theories about soldiers' reluctance to shoot to kill, but could also be accounted for by the fact that the Fenians had deployed only their skirmishers in an attempt to lure the Canadians towards their main force which did not advance until the last minutes of the battle, when they launched a bayonet attack that broke Canadian lines.

Fenian withdrawal
The battle at Ridgeway was followed by a Fenian victory later in the afternoon over the heavily outnumbered Canadian volunteer  Welland Field Battery (armed as an infantry unit) and the Dunnville Naval Brigade at Fort Erie. Nevertheless, the rapid convergence of large British and Canadian reinforcements convinced many of the Fenians to return in haste to the United States – some on logs, on rafts, or by swimming. O'Neill and 850 Fenians surrendered their arms to waiting U.S. authorities. In his book, 1916: The Easter Rising, Tim Pat Coogan said the force was described at the time as the Irish Republican Army.

Aftermath

Some of the Canadians were particularly bitter at what they saw as Booker's mismanagement of the battle and believed that had he not given the order to withdraw they would have won the day.  In fact, the Canadians were only fighting the Fenian advance units, who were steadily luring the Canadians forward towards the main Fenian force, which was waiting for them on the high ground north of Bertie Road.  Had the Canadians not retreated, short on ammunition and inexperienced, they might have faced a heavier defeat by the Civil War veterans of the main Fenian army (which was so well-supplied with ammunition that they dumped thousands of rounds into Black Creek on the eve of the battle in order to lighten their load). The Fenians were so experienced in handling their single-shot muzzle-loading weapons that it was wrongly reported that they were all armed with seven-shot Spencer repeating rifles. Fewer than half of the Canadians on the field had practised firing live rounds before the day of the battle and there had been no military conflict in Canada since the Rebellions of 1837–38.

Since the Queen's Own Rifles have been continuously active in the Canadian military since 1860, the men who fell or were wounded at Limestone Ridge can be considered the first casualties of the Canadian Army; even though it was not formally established as such until 1883. Ensign Malcolm McEachren of No. 5 Company, QOR, killed leading his men in the opening minutes of the battle, can therefore be considered the Canadian army's first man killed in action. The final casualty figures for the Fenian Raids into Canada 1866, when including deaths from disease while on service in both Canada West (Ontario) and Canada East (Quebec), were calculated by the Militia Department in 1868 as 32 dead and 103 wounded or felled by disease (including a female civilian accidentally shot by the militia). One British soldier from the 47th Lancashire Regiment of Foot, Corporal Carrington, died from heat stroke on a forced march from Chippawa to Stevensville on the morning of the battle. His grave was identified in November 2012.

Legacy

The Canadian press exaggerated the scope and nature of the defeat at Ridgeway, particularly anti-confederationist press which claimed Ridgeway was proof that Canadians will never be able to defend themselves without the presence of the British Army. The inefficiency of the Militia Department under Canada West's attorney general and minister of militia John A. Macdonald was covered up by two Military Boards of Inquiry that concluded that the blame lay with inexperienced frontline troops that panicked and broke, and not with the officers who led them and the government who undersupplied and undertrained them.  The Battle of Ridgeway became a point of shame in Canadian national military heritage and history and the Canadian government was reluctant to recognize or acknowledge the veterans of the battle for nearly 25 years.

In 1890, the Veterans of '66 Association held a protest demonstration at the Volunteers Monument in Queen's Park by laying flowers at the foot of the monument on June 2, the 24th anniversary of the battle of Ridgeway. It took a 10-year campaign of protest and lobbying for the Canadian government to sanction a Fenian Raid Medal and land grants to veterans in 1899–1900.  The protest became an annual memorial event known as Decoration Day, when graves and monuments of Canadian soldiers were "decorated" in flowers.  For the next 30 years from 1890 to 1931, Decoration would be Canada's popular national memorial day, the first Remembrance Day, commemorated on the weekend nearest to June 2 and acknowledging Canadian dead in the Battle of Ridgeway, the North-West Rebellion (1885), the South African War (1899–1902), and the Great War (1914–1918).  In 1931 the Remembrance Day Act established November 11, Armistice Day, as Canada's national official memorial day.  At the same time the Remembrance Day Act expelled the casualties of Ridgeway and the Northwest Rebellion from national memorialization, fixing Remembrance Day to Canadian casualties overseas starting from the South African War.

The Battle of Ridgeway was Canada's first modern battle, the first fought exclusively by Canadian troops and led on the battlefield entirely by Canadian officers, the battle in which Canada's current modern military sustained its first thirty troops killed in action, and the last battle fought within the present-day boundaries of Ontario against a foreign invasion.

Memory
The site of the battle is commemorated by a cairn and interpretive signs on the north side of Garrison Road between Ridge Road and Burleigh Road. The site has been designated as a National Historic Site. An historic house (which was not involved in the battle) has also been moved to the site.

The Canadian Volunteer Monument in Queen's Park, Toronto, honours nine Toronto militia volunteers from The Queen's Own Rifles of Canada including three University of Toronto student volunteers who fell in the Battle, and is located on the west side of Queen's Park Crescent in Toronto.

Order of battle

See also
 List of conflicts in Canada

Notes

References

Further reading
 Books on the Battle of Ridgeway pre-1911 in chronological order of publication
 [s.n.]  (The Fenian Raid Into Canada) The Fenian Raid At Fort Erie, Toronto: W.C. Chewett & Co., 1866
 Denison, George T.  History of the Fenian Raid On Fort Erie; With an Account of the Battle of Ridgeway, June, 1866, Toronto: Rollo & Adam, 1866
 Gauust, Doscen  B.F.H.D. [pseudonym], History of the Fenian Invasion, of Canada, Hamilton: W.M. Brown & Co, 1866
 Somerville, Alexander   Narrative of the Fenian Invasion of Canada, Hamilton, Ont.: Joseph Lyght, 1866
 Gregg, George R. and Roden, E. P. Trials of the Fenian Prisoners at Toronto, Toronto: Leader Steam-Press, 1867
 Dubh, Scian [James McCarroll], Ridgeway:  An Historical Romance of the Fenian Invasion of Canada, Buffalo, NY: McCarrol & Co, 1868
 Books on the Battle of Ridgeway since 1911
 
 Owen, David The Year of the Fenians: A Self-Guided Tour of Discovery and an Illustrated History of the Fenian Invasion of the Niagara Peninsula and the Battle of Ridgeway in 1866, Buffalo, NY: Western New York Heritage Institute, 1990.
 Reid, Brian A. "'Prepare for Cavalry!' The Battle of Ridgeway" in Donald E. Graves (ed), Fighting for Canada:  Seven Battles, 1758–1945, Toronto: Robin Brass Studio, 2000.
  Also under .
 Vronsky, Peter Ridgeway: The American Fenian Invasion and the 1866 Battle That Made Canada., Toronto: Penguin Canada-Allen Lane, 2011.

External links

 Ridgeway: The American Fenian Invasion and the 1866 Battle That Made Canada, Peter Vronsky
 The Fenian Raid 1866, The Queen's Own Rifles of Canada (archived April 30, 2005)
 
 Canadian Volunteer Monument
 Fenians.org
 Ridgeway Battle Documents & Fenian Raids 1866 Original Sources Links

Conflicts in 1866
Battles involving Canada
Conflicts in Canada
Fenian Raids
Queen's Own Rifles of Canada
Royal Hamilton Light Infantry (Wentworth Regiment)
June 1866 events
1866 in Ontario
History of the Regional Municipality of Niagara